Walkowiak is a Polish surname. It may refer to:
 Andrzej Walkowiak (born 1961), Polish politician and journalist
 Daniela Walkowiak-Pilecka (born 1935), Polish sprint canoer
 David John Walkowiak (born 1953), American Roman Catholic prelate
 Mariusz Walkowiak (born 1970), Polish sprint canoer
 Roger Walkowiak (1927–2017), French road bicycle racer

See also
 

Polish-language surnames
Patronymic surnames